Phu Chong–Na Yoi National Park is a protected area at the eastern end of the Dângrêk Mountains, northeastern Thailand. It is in Buntharik, Na Chaluai, and Nam Yuen districts of Ubon Ratchathani Province. Established in 1987, it is an IUCN Category II protected area, measuring 428,750 rai ~ . In a mountainous area, the park borders Laos and Cambodia. Natural features include the cliffs at Pha Phueng, and the  Bak Teo Yai Waterfall. In 2004, a specimen of a new frog species, Fejervarya triora, was discovered in the park.

Sights
Namtok Huai Luang or Namtok Bak Teo (น้ำตกห้วยหลวง หรือ น้ำตกบักเตว) - Plunging down three steps from an elevation of 30 metres, the waterfall has a small pool with a white beach and turquoise coloured water.
Phlan Yao Rock Garden (สวนหินพลานยาว) - Rocks in different formations are scattered around the area.
Pha Phueng Viewpoint (จุดชมทิวทัศน์ผาผึ้ง) - The viewpoint is next to the rock garden.
It originates from the Lam Dom Noi Stream.
Kaeng Sila Thip (แก่งศิลาทิพย์) - Huai Luang Stream runs over a rock terrace and turns fierce in the rapids. In the middle of the stream, its power has created many holes on the rock surface in different sizes and depths called "kumphalak".
Phlan Kong Kwian (พลาญกงเกวียน) - The vast rock terrace with rock shelters at the front is home to wild flowers and plants. In previous days, travellers could seek shelter here. It came to be called "phlan kong kwian", which means "cart terrace".
Phu Hin Dang (ภูหินด่าง) - a cliff-top place to view the forest scenery of Laos and Cambodia. The cliff is brightly coloured. Geologists explain that this is due to dry weather millions of years ago catalyzing mineral residues in the seawater.

See also
List of national parks of Thailand
List of Protected Areas Regional Offices of Thailand

References

External links

Protected Planet: Phu Chong Na Yoi National Park

National parks of Thailand
Dângrêk Mountains
IUCN Category II
Protected areas established in 1987
Tourist attractions in Ubon Ratchathani province
1987 establishments in Thailand